Jê or Gê are the people who spoke Jê languages of the northern South American Caribbean coast and Brazil. In Brazil, the Jê were found in Rio de Janeiro, Minas Gerais, Bahia, Piaui, Mato Grosso, Goias, Tocantins, Maranhão, and as far south as Paraguay.

They include the Timbira, the Kayapó, and the Suyá of the northwestern Jê; the Xavante, the Xerente, and the Akroá of the central Jê; the Karajá; the Jeikó; the Kamakán; Maxakalí; the Guayaná; the Purí (Coroado); the Bororo (Boe); the Gavião, and others. The southern Jê include the Kaingang and the Xokleng.

References
This article is based in part on material from the Croatian Wikipedia.

Indigenous peoples of South America
Indigenous peoples in Brazil
Indigenous peoples of the Guianas